Harold Rivers was an English professional football player and manager.

Career
After beginning his career in England with Southampton, Rivers moved to France to play with Sète, Saint-Étienne and Arras.

While at Saint-Étienne, Rivers managed the first-team between 1933 and 1934.

References

Year of birth missing
Year of death missing
Association football defenders
English footballers
Southampton F.C. players
FC Sète 34 players
AS Saint-Étienne players
Ligue 1 players
Ligue 2 players
English football managers
AS Saint-Étienne managers